CHTK-FM is a Canadian radio station that broadcasts an adult hits format at 99.1 FM in Prince Rupert, British Columbia. The station is branded as Bounce 99.1. CHTK is owned by Bell Media.

The station has been broadcasting at its current frequency since October 21, 2011. It previously broadcast at 560 kHz from its first sign-on in 1965 until 2011.

On January 11, 2011, CHTK received Canadian Radio-television and Telecommunications Commission approval to convert CHTK to 99.1 MHz.

As part of a mass format reorganization by Bell Media, on May 18, 2021, CHTK flipped to adult hits, and adopted the Bounce branding.

Past station logos

References

External links
Bounce 99.1
 
 

Htk
Htk
Htk
Mass media in Prince Rupert, British Columbia
Radio stations established in 1965
1965 establishments in British Columbia